Border reivers were raiders along the Anglo-Scottish border between the 13th and 16th centuries.

Border reivers may also refer to:

 Border Reivers (rugby union), a former rugby team in Scotland
Border Reivers (game), a 2006 board game
 "Border Reiver", a song by Mark Knopfler from the 2009 album Get Lucky
 Carlisle Border Reivers, a former American football club in England
 Border Reivers (racing team), a former motor racing team from Scotland

See also
Reaver (disambiguation)
The Reivers (disambiguation)
Border ruffian, a proslavery raider from Missouri, before the American Civil War